The 2017 Tulsa Golden Hurricane football team represented the University of Tulsa in the 2017 NCAA Division I FBS football season. The Golden Hurricane played their home games at the Skelly Field at H. A. Chapman Stadium in Tulsa, Oklahoma, and competed in the West Division of the American Athletic Conference. They were led by third-year head coach Philip Montgomery. They finished the season 2–10, 1–7 in AAC play to finish in last place in the West Division.

Schedule
Tulsa announced its 2017 football schedule on February 9, 2017. The 2017 schedule consists of 6 home and away games in the regular season. The Golden Hurricane will host AAC foes Houston, Memphis, Navy, and Temple, and will travel to UConn, SMU, South Florida, and Tulane.

The Golden Hurricane will host two of the four non-conference opponents, Louisiana from the Sun Belt Conference and New Mexico from the Mountain West Conference, and will travel to Oklahoma State from the Big 12 Conference and Toledo from the Mid-American Conference.

Game summaries

at Oklahoma State

Louisiana

at Toledo

New Mexico

Navy

at Tulane

Houston

at UConn

at SMU

Memphis

at South Florida

Temple

Roster

References

Tulsa
Tulsa Golden Hurricane football seasons
Tulsa Golden Hurricane football